Carolina Dreams, released in 1977, was The Marshall Tucker Band's sixth album and an ode to the band's home state, South Carolina, USA. Focusing on Western themes, it spawned their biggest hit to date, "Heard It In a Love Song", which rose to #14 on the Billboard Hot 100, taking the album with it to #22 and #23 on the Country and Pop charts, respectively. They toured early that year to promote the album. A bonus live version of "Silverado" appears on the 2005 reissue which was recorded the year after the death of bassist and founding member, Tommy Caldwell.

Track listing
All songs written by Toy Caldwell except where noted.

Side one
"Fly Like an Eagle" - 3:03
"Heard It in a Love Song" - 4:55
"I Should Have Never Started Lovin' You" (Toy Caldwell, Doug Gray, George McCorkle) - 7:10
"Life in a Song" (Jerry Eubanks, McCorkle) - 3:33

Side two
"Desert Skies" - 6:24
"Never Trust A Stranger" (Tommy Caldwell) - 5:28
"Tell It To The Devil" - 6:45

 2004 CD reissue bonus track
"Silverado" (George McCorkle) - (recorded live 1981 Winter Garden Theater - Dallas Texas)

Personnel
 
Doug Gray - lead vocals
Toy Caldwell - lead, acoustic and steel guitars
Tommy Caldwell - bass, tambourine, and background vocals
George McCorkle - electric, twelve string and acoustic guitars
Paul Riddle - drums
Jerry Eubanks - flute, saxophone, background vocals

Guest musicians:
Paul Hornsby - Piano and organ
Charlie Daniels - Fiddle and harmony vocal on "Desert Skies". (Charlie Daniels appears courtesy of Epic Records)
Chuck Leavell - Piano on "Life In A Song"
Jaimoe - Congas
Leo LaBranche - Horn section arrangements and trumpet on "Life In A Song" and "I Should Have Never Started Lovin' You"
Dezso Lakatos - Tenor sax as part of the horn section.

Production
Producer: Paul Hornsby
Recording Engineer: Kurt Kinzel, Richard Schoff, David Pinkston
Art Direction: Diana Kaylan
Design: John Kehe
Photography: David Alexander
Handlettering: Bill Franks

References

Marshall Tucker Band albums
Capricorn Records albums
1977 albums
Albums produced by Paul Hornsby